Schultze's stream frog (Ptychohyla leonhardschultzei) is a species of frog in the family Hylidae endemic to Mexico. It is only known from the Pacific slopes of the Sierra Madre del Sur in Oaxaca and Guerrero states. Its natural habitats are pine-oak and cloud forests. It occurs in or on low vegetation along mountain streams. It is anuncommon species threatened by habitat loss from deforestation and the planting of coffee and other non-timber plantations. Also chytridiomycosis is suspected.

References

Ptychohyla
Fauna of the Sierra Madre del Sur
Endemic amphibians of Mexico
Frogs of North America
Endangered biota of Mexico
Endangered fauna of North America
Amphibians described in 1934
Taxonomy articles created by Polbot